The 2022 CONMEBOL South American Beach Soccer League (officially, Liga Evolucion de Fútbol Playa (Beach Soccer Evolution League)) is the fourth edition of the South American Beach Soccer League, a continental league competition for South American men's national beach soccer teams. The competition returns for the first time since 2019, having been unable to take place in 2020 and 2021 due to the effects of the COVID-19 pandemic in South America.

Organised by the governing body for South American football, CONMEBOL, as part of its Development Department's Evolution Program, all ten members of the continental confederation take part, with both senior and under 20s national teams participating in the league events.

The teams are first divided into two geographically based zones (North and South) to compete in a round robin tournament against other members of their own zone during the regular season; the points earned by both the senior and under 20s teams are combined. The winners of each zone then proceed to face each other in the finals to contest the title.

Format

The league operates under the same format established for the inaugural season.

Calendar

Teams

The ten member nations of CONMEBOL enter two teams each: their respective senior and under 20s national teams. In total, 20 teams will compete.

For this season, CONMEBOL altered the existing composition of the two zones back to their original states.

The numbers in parentheses show the South American ranking of each team prior to the start of the season (rankings only apply to the senior teams).

North zone

 (1st)
 (5th)
 (9th)
 (7th)
 (6th)

South zone

 (4th)
 (10th)
 (8th)
 (3rd)
 (2nd)

South zone
The south zone regular season event took place in the Argentinian city of Santa Fe. All matches were hosted on Playa Grande at the Costanera Oeste complex. It was organised in cooperation with the Argentine Football Association (AFA). Paraguay won the event.

Standings

Results

Senior category

Under 20s category

North zone
The north zone regular season event takes place in the Ecuadorian town of La Libertad. All matches are hosted on Playa Cautivo (Captive beach) at a purpose built venue. It is organised in cooperation with the Ecuadorian Football Federation (FEF). Approximately US$300,000 was invested into the event.

Standings

Results

Senior category

Under 20s category

Finals
The zone winners play each other for the league title; their senior teams play each other over two legs, as do their under 20s representatives for a total of four matches comprising the finals. The winners are the nation which accumulates the most points from all four matches combined.

Details TBA.

References

External Links
Reglamento CONMEBOL Liga Evolución de Fútbol Playa, at CONMEBOL.com (in Spanish)

2022 in beach soccer
2022 in South American football
2022 in Argentine sport
South American Beach Soccer League